Sean Bellerby is an Australian entrepreneur. He is the founding CEO and President of GoSnow, Inc., a Los Angeles-based investor backed software company known for taking the worldwide snow sports industry on demand.

Bellerby graduated from Macquarie University in 2012 with an MBA, and Master of Marketing degree. In addition to Macquarie University, and prior to starting GoSnow, Bellerby had spent 12 years in senior business development roles in U.S. enterprise software companies such as Mercury Interactive, Intel Security, and CA Technologies in varying locations around the world. His last tenure in the enterprise software business was at CA Technologies as an executive responsible for taking new cloud services to market through global service provider partnerships.

Bellerby co-founded GoSnow in 2016 with American Scott Anfang. Its first product was a meet-up app for skiers and snowboarders which was credited as a world first.
 
In January 2017, GoSnow innovatively took the snows sports industry on demand by releasing its on demand bookings platform for snow sports instructors and activities around the world.

References

Australian businesspeople
Bellerby, Sean
Year of birth missing (living people)
Place of birth missing (living people)
Macquarie University alumni